Namson Tran (born 3 December 1968 in Vietnam) is a Solomon Islands businessman and politician.

Born in Vietnam, Tran moved first to Vanuatu then to Solomon Islands, where he married a Solomon Islander and became a naturalised citizen.

He worked as an accountant before becoming "a high-profile businessman", the owner of Honiara Casino, the "biggest casino" in the Solomons.

His political career began when he was elected to the National Parliament as MP for West Honiara, a constituency in the capital city, Honiara, in the August 2010 general election. He was elected as an independent, being a member of no political party. The following month, he was elected Deputy Speaker of Parliament, as deputy to Speaker Sir Allan Kemakeza. He resigned from the deputy speakership at the start of December 2011.

References

1968 births
Living people
Members of the National Parliament of the Solomon Islands
Naturalised citizens of the Solomon Islands
Politicians of Vietnamese descent
Solomon Islands businesspeople
Vietnamese emigrants to the Solomon Islands